Williard Lee Proctor (December 11, 1915 – October 30, 1998) was an American Thoroughbred racehorse trainer. A longtime trainer in California, he began his career as a jockey at bush tracks in Texas and Louisiana. After his riding days were over he turned to training, moving to California in 1955. From then through to his retirement in 1996 he conditioned 58 stakes winners.

A 2003 inductee in the Texas Horse Racing Hall of Fame, the Willard L. Proctor Memorial Stakes at Hollywood Park is named in his honor. His son Tom is a trainer.

In 1972, Convenience, trained by Willard Proctor, defeated Typecast in a $250,000 winner-take-all match race in front of 53,575 fans at Hollywood Park.

References

1915 births
1998 deaths
American racehorse trainers
People from Lampasas, Texas